José Tohá González (February 6, 1927 – March 15, 1974) was a Chilean journalist, lawyer, and politician of the Socialist Party (PS).

Biography
Tohá was born in Chillán, the son of Spanish immigrant José Tohá Soldavilla and of Brunilda González Monteagudo. After completing his secondary studies in his natal city, he studied law at the  Universidad de Chile. While there, he was president of the University of Chile Student Federation (FECh) between 1950–1951. In 1958, he joined the staff of the newspaper Última Hora, and in 1960 he became its editor and majority owner, a position he held until 1970.

In 1942, while still a high school student, Tohá joined the Socialist Party of Chile (PS). He rose to member of its Central Committee, and worked in all four of Salvador Allende's presidential campaigns in 1952, 1958, 1964 and 1970. As the first democratically elected socialist president, President Salvador Allende named Tohá his first Minister of the Interior and vice president, a position he held until he was accused by Congress of tolerating the creation of left-wing paramilitary organizations. Allende responded by naming him Minister of Defense, a deliberate challenge to his right-wing detractors. As such, Tohá had to deal with the Tanquetazo putsch, the first attempt at a military-led coup d'état, on 29 June 1973.

During the coup d'état of September 11, 1973, Tohá was seized and arrested at La Moneda, where he had gone to support the defense of the democratic administration. He was held in different concentration camps suffering severe torture. After first being held at the Bernardo O'Higgins Military Academy, he was later sent for eight months to a concentration camp in Dawson Island. From there, he was transferred to the basement of the Air Force War Academy.

On 1 February 1974, Tohá was moved to room 303 at the Military Hospital in Santiago in a precarious state of health, suffering from acute attack of gastric ulcers. He recovered slightly and was able to share a few minutes with his wife and children on his 47th birthday on February 6. Despite his poor health, the military officers continued harassing him with endless torture and interrogation sessions. His physical state deteriorated, his weight dropped precipitously and he lost his eyesight. He could no longer walk nor take care of himself. The further interrogations in the Air Force’s War Academy only worsened his condition.

On March 15, at 12.55, he was found hanged inside the closet of his hospital room. The official explanation was that he had committed suicide "in the grip of a very strong nervous depression, with psycho-somatic effects". The family has never accepted that version, and claimed he was murdered. On 15 November 2010, 36 years after his death, the Court of Appeals of Santiago ordered an exhumation of Tohá's remains. A forensic study concluded that he did not commit suicide, but rather died as a result of "asphyxia due to manual strangulation of a homicidal nature". On 4 December 2015, Ramón Cáceres Jorquera and Sergio Contreras Mejías, two retired colonels of the Chilean Air Force, were found responsible for the torture of Tohá and sentenced to three years in prison.

After his death, his wife and children lived in exile in Mexico City for several years. His family returned to Chile in the early 80's, where his wife worked in the resistance to the Augusto Pinochet's military dictatorship.

Personal life

Tohá married Raquel Victoria Morales Etchevers (also known as Moy de Tohá) in 1963. After democracy was regained in 1990, Etchevers served as Cultural Attaché in Mexico and as an Ambassador to Honduras and El Salvador. Together, they had two children: their daughter, Carolina Tohá, is the current Minister of the Interior and Public Security of Chile since 6 September 2022; she was previously mayor of Santiago in 2012–2016. Their son, José Tohá, obtained undergraduate and graduate degrees in architecture in the United States, where he founded an architecture office in Washington, D.C..

Additional information

External links and references
Biographical sketch 
Memorial to José Tohá with information on his prison time.
La Nacion newspaper  Information on the judicial investigation about his death
Alternative version of his death

Citations

1927 births
1974 deaths
People from Chillán
Chilean people of Spanish descent
Presidents of the University of Chile Student Federation
Socialist Party of Chile politicians
Chilean lawyers
Chilean journalists
Chilean socialists
Presidency of Salvador Allende
Chilean Ministers of the Interior
Chilean Ministers of Defense
Chilean torture victims
Chilean people who died in prison custody
Prisoners who died in Chilean detention
Assassinated Chilean politicians